Florian Van Acker (born 28 February 1997) is a Belgian para table tennis player who competes in international level events. He is a Paralympic champion, World champion and double European champion in the men's singles. He is trained by former World and Paralympic champion Nico Vergeylen.

Van Acker is autistic and intellectually disabled.

References

1997 births
Living people
Paralympic table tennis players of Belgium
Table tennis players at the 2016 Summer Paralympics
Medalists at the 2016 Summer Paralympics
Sportspeople with autism
People with intellectual disability
Table tennis players at the 2020 Summer Paralympics
Belgian male table tennis players
Romanian emigrants to Austria